Anomiopus laetus is a species of true dung beetle that is endemic to Brazil, and is known from Amazonas, Pará and Acre states. It may be a myrmecophile.

References

laetus
Endemic fauna of Brazil
Beetles described in 1891